Epicurus (341–270 BC) was an ancient Greek philosopher and sage who founded Epicureanism, a highly influential school of philosophy. He was born on the Greek island of Samos to Athenian parents. Influenced by Democritus, Aristippus, Pyrrho, and possibly the Cynics, he turned against the Platonism of his day and established his own school, known as "the Garden", in Athens. Epicurus and his followers were known for eating simple meals and discussing a wide range of philosophical subjects. He openly allowed women and slaves to join the school as a matter of policy. Of the over 300 works said to have been written by Epicurus about various subjects, the vast majority have been destroyed. Only three letters written by him—the letters to Menoeceus, Pythocles, and Herodotus—and two collections of quotes—the Principal Doctrines and the Vatican Sayings—have survived intact, along with a few fragments of his other writings. As a result of his work's destruction, most knowledge about his philosophy is due to later authors, particularly the biographer Diogenes Laërtius, the Epicurean Roman poet Lucretius and the Epicurean philosopher Philodemus, and with hostile but largely accurate accounts by the Pyrrhonist philosopher Sextus Empiricus, and the Academic Skeptic and statesman Cicero.

Epicurus asserted that philosophy's purpose is to attain as well as to help others attain happy (eudaimonic), tranquil lives characterized by ataraxia (peace and freedom from fear) and aponia (the absence of pain). He advocated that people were best able to pursue philosophy by living a self-sufficient life surrounded by friends. He taught that the root of all human neurosis is death denial and the tendency for human beings to assume that death will be horrific and painful, which he claimed causes unnecessary anxiety, selfish self-protective behaviors, and hypocrisy. According to Epicurus, death is the end of both the body and the soul and therefore should not be feared. Epicurus taught that although the gods exist, they have no involvement in human affairs. He taught that people should act ethically not because the gods punish or reward them for their actions but because, due to the power of guilt, amoral behavior would inevitably lead to remorse weighing on their consciences and as a result, they would be prevented from attaining ataraxia. 

Epicurus was an empiricist, meaning he believed that only the senses are a reliable source of knowledge about the world. He derived much of his physics and cosmology from the earlier philosopher Democritus ( 460– 370 BC). Like Democritus, Epicurus taught that the universe is infinite and eternal and that all matter is made up of extremely tiny, invisible particles known as atoms. All occurrences in the natural world are ultimately the result of atoms moving and interacting in empty space. Epicurus deviated from Democritus by proposing the idea of atomic "swerve", which holds that atoms may deviate from their expected course, thus permitting humans to possess free will in an otherwise deterministic universe.

Though popular, Epicurean teachings were controversial from the beginning. Epicureanism reached the height of its popularity during the late years of the Roman Republic. It died out in late antiquity, subject to hostility from early Christianity. Throughout the Middle Ages Epicurus was popularly, though inaccurately, remembered as a patron of drunkards, whoremongers, and gluttons. His teachings gradually became more widely known in the fifteenth century with the rediscovery of important texts, but his ideas did not become acceptable until the seventeenth century, when the French Catholic priest Pierre Gassendi revived a modified version of them, which was promoted by other writers, including Walter Charleton and Robert Boyle. His influence grew considerably during and after the Enlightenment, profoundly impacting the ideas of major thinkers, including John Locke, Thomas Jefferson, Jeremy Bentham, and Karl Marx.

Life

Upbringing and influences

Epicurus was born in the Athenian settlement on the Aegean island of Samos in February 341 BC. His parents, Neocles and Chaerestrate, were both Athenian-born, and his father was an Athenian citizen. Epicurus grew up during the final years of the Greek Classical Period. Plato had died seven years before Epicurus was born and Epicurus was seven years old when Alexander the Great crossed the Hellespont into Persia. As a child, Epicurus would have received a typical ancient Greek education. As such, according to Norman Wentworth DeWitt, "it is inconceivable that he would have escaped the Platonic training in geometry, dialectic, and rhetoric." Epicurus is known to have studied under the instruction of a Samian Platonist named Pamphilus, probably for about four years. His Letter of Menoeceus and surviving fragments of his other writings strongly suggest that he had extensive training in rhetoric. After the death of Alexander the Great, Perdiccas expelled the Athenian settlers on Samos to Colophon, on the coast of what is now Turkey. After the completion of his military service, Epicurus joined his family there. He studied under Nausiphanes, who followed the teachings of Democritus, and later those of Pyrrho, whose way of life Epicurus greatly admired.

Epicurus's teachings were heavily influenced by those of earlier philosophers, particularly Democritus. Nonetheless, Epicurus differed from his predecessors on several key points of determinism and vehemently denied having been influenced by any previous philosophers, whom he denounced as "confused". Instead, he insisted that he had been "self-taught". According to DeWitt, Epicurus's teachings also show influences from the contemporary philosophical school of Cynicism. The Cynic philosopher Diogenes of Sinope was still alive when Epicurus would have been in Athens for his required military training and it is possible they may have met. Diogenes's pupil Crates of Thebes ( 365 –  285 BC) was a close contemporary of Epicurus. Epicurus agreed with the Cynics' quest for honesty, but rejected their "insolence and vulgarity", instead teaching that honesty must be coupled with courtesy and kindness. Epicurus shared this view with his contemporary, the comic playwright Menander.

Epicurus's Letter to Menoeceus, possibly an early work of his, is written in an eloquent style similar to that of the Athenian rhetorician Isocrates (436–338 BC), but, for his later works, he seems to have adopted the bald, intellectual style of the mathematician Euclid. Epicurus's epistemology also bears an unacknowledged debt to the later writings of Aristotle (384–322 BC), who rejected the Platonic idea of hypostatic Reason and instead relied on nature and empirical evidence for knowledge about the universe. During Epicurus's formative years, Greek knowledge about the rest of the world was rapidly expanding due to the Hellenization of the Near East and the rise of Hellenistic kingdoms. Epicurus's philosophy was consequently more universal in its outlook than those of his predecessors, since it took cognizance of non-Greek peoples as well as Greeks. He may have had access to the now-lost writings of the historian and ethnographer Megasthenes, who wrote during the reign of Seleucus I Nicator (ruled 305–281 BC).

Teaching career

During Epicurus's lifetime, Platonism was the dominant philosophy in higher education. Epicurus's opposition to Platonism formed a large part of his thought. Over half of the forty Principal Doctrines of Epicureanism are flat contradictions of Platonism. In around 311 BC, Epicurus, when he was around thirty years old, began teaching in Mytilene. Around this time, Zeno of Citium, the founder of Stoicism, arrived in Athens, at the age of about twenty-one, but Zeno did not begin teaching what would become Stoicism for another twenty years. Although later texts, such as the writings of the first-century BC Roman orator Cicero, portray Epicureanism and Stoicism as rivals, this rivalry seems to have only emerged after Epicurus's death.

Epicurus's teachings caused strife in Mytilene and he was forced to leave. He then founded a school in Lampsacus before returning to Athens in  306 BC, where he remained until his death. There he founded The Garden (κῆπος), a school named for the garden he owned that served as the school's meeting place, about halfway between the locations of two other schools of philosophy, the Stoa and the Academy. The Garden was more than just a school; it was "a community of like-minded and aspiring practitioners of a particular way of life." The primary members were Hermarchus, the financier Idomeneus, Leonteus and his wife Themista, the satirist Colotes, the mathematician Polyaenus of Lampsacus, and Metrodorus of Lampsacus, the most famous popularizer of Epicureanism. His school was the first of the ancient Greek philosophical schools to admit women as a rule rather than an exception, and the biography of Epicurus by Diogenes Laërtius lists female students such as Leontion and Nikidion. An inscription on the gate to The Garden is recorded by Seneca the Younger in epistle XXI of Epistulae morales ad Lucilium: "Stranger, here you will do well to tarry; here our highest good is pleasure."

According to Diskin Clay, Epicurus himself established a custom of celebrating his birthday annually with common meals, befitting his stature as heros ktistes ("founding hero") of the Garden. He ordained in his will annual memorial feasts for himself on the same date (10th of Gamelion month). Epicurean communities continued this tradition, referring to Epicurus as their "saviour" (soter) and celebrating him as hero. The hero cult of Epicurus may have operated as a Garden variety civic religion. However, clear evidence of an Epicurean hero cult, as well as the cult itself, seems buried by the weight of posthumous philosophical interpretation. Epicurus never married and had no known children. He was most likely a vegetarian.

Death
Diogenes Laërtius records that, according to Epicurus's successor Hermarchus, Epicurus died a slow and painful death in 270 BC at the age of seventy-two from a stone blockage of his urinary tract. Despite being in immense pain, Epicurus is said to have remained cheerful and to have continued to teach until the very end. Possible insights into Epicurus's death may be offered by the extremely brief Epistle to Idomeneus, included by Diogenes Laërtius in Book X of his Lives and Opinions of Eminent Philosophers. The authenticity of this letter is uncertain and it may be a later pro-Epicurean forgery intended to paint an admirable portrait of the philosopher to counter the large number of forged epistles in Epicurus's name portraying him unfavorably.
I have written this letter to you on a happy day to me, which is also the last day of my life. For I have been attacked by a painful inability to urinate, and also dysentery, so violent that nothing can be added to the violence of my sufferings. But the cheerfulness of my mind, which comes from the recollection of all my philosophical contemplation, counterbalances all these afflictions. And I beg you to take care of the children of Metrodorus, in a manner worthy of the devotion shown by the young man to me, and to philosophy.

If authentic, this letter would support the tradition that Epicurus was able to remain joyful to the end, even in the midst of his suffering. It would also indicate that he maintained a special concern for the wellbeing of children.

Philosophy

Epistemology
Epicurus and his followers had a well-developed epistemology, which developed as a result of their rivalry with other philosophical schools. Epicurus wrote a treatise entitled , or Rule, in which he explained his methods of investigation and theory of knowledge. This book, however, has not survived, nor does any other text that fully and clearly explains Epicurean epistemology, leaving only mentions of this epistemology by several authors to reconstruct it.  Epicurus was an ardent Empiricist; believing that the senses are the only reliable sources of information about the world. He rejected the Platonic idea of "Reason" as a reliable source of knowledge about the world apart from the senses and was bitterly opposed to the Pyrrhonists and Academic Skeptics, who not only questioned the ability of the senses to provide accurate knowledge about the world, but also whether it is even possible to know anything about the world at all.

Epicurus maintained that the senses never deceive humans, but that the senses can be misinterpreted. Epicurus held that the purpose of all knowledge is to aid humans in attaining ataraxia. He taught that knowledge is learned through experiences rather than innate and that the acceptance of the fundamental truth of the things a person perceives is essential to a person's moral and spiritual health. In the Letter to Pythocles, he states, "If a person fights the clear evidence of his senses he will never be able to share in genuine tranquility." Epicurus regarded gut feelings as the ultimate authority on matters of morality and held that whether a person feels an action is right or wrong is a far more cogent guide to whether that act really is right or wrong than abstracts maxims, strict codified rules of ethics, or even reason itself.

Epicurus permitted that any and every statement that is not directly contrary to human perception has the possibility to be true. Nonetheless, anything contrary to a person's experience can be ruled out as false. Epicureans often used analogies to everyday experience to support their argument of so-called "imperceptibles", which included anything that a human being cannot perceive, such as the motion of atoms. In line with this principle of non-contradiction, the Epicureans believed that events in the natural world may have multiple causes that are all equally possible and probable. Lucretius writes in On the Nature of Things, as translated by William Ellery Leonard:
There be, besides, some thing
Of which 'tis not enough one only cause
To state—but rather several, whereof one
Will be the true: lo, if thou shouldst espy
Lying afar some fellow's lifeless corse,
'Twere meet to name all causes of a death,
That cause of his death might thereby be named:
For prove thou mayst he perished not by steel,
By cold, nor even by poison nor disease,
Yet somewhat of this sort hath come to him
We know—And thus we have to say the same
In divers cases.
Epicurus strongly favored naturalistic explanations over theological ones. In his Letter to Pythocles, he offers four different possible natural explanations for thunder, six different possible natural explanations for lightning, three for snow, three for comets, two for rainbows, two for earthquakes, and so on. Although all of these explanations are now known to be false, they were an important step in the history of science, because Epicurus was trying to explain natural phenomena using natural explanations, rather than resorting to inventing elaborate stories about gods and mythic heroes.

Ethics

Epicurus was a hedonist, meaning he taught that what is pleasurable is morally good and what is painful is morally evil. He idiosyncratically defined "pleasure" as the absence of suffering and taught that all humans should seek to attain the state of ataraxia, meaning "untroubledness", a state in which the person is completely free from all pain or suffering. He argued that most of the suffering which human beings experience is caused by the irrational fears of death, divine retribution, and punishment in the afterlife. In his Letter to Menoeceus, Epicurus explains that people seek wealth and power on account of these fears, believing that having more money, prestige, or political clout will save them from death. He, however, maintains that death is the end of existence, that the terrifying stories of punishment in the afterlife are ridiculous superstitions, and that death is therefore nothing to be feared. He writes in his Letter to Menoeceus: "Accustom thyself to believe that death is nothing to us, for good and evil imply sentience, and death is the privation of all sentience;... Death, therefore, the most awful of evils, is nothing to us, seeing that, when we are, death is not come, and, when death is come, we are not." From this doctrine arose the Epicurean epitaph: Non fui, fui, non-sum, non-curo ("I was not; I was; I am not; I do not care"), which is inscribed on the gravestones of his followers and seen on many ancient gravestones of the Roman Empire. This quotation is often used today at humanist funerals.

The Tetrapharmakos presents a summary of the key points of Epicurean ethics:

 Don't fear god
 Don't worry about death
 What is good is easy to get
 What is terrible is easy to endure

Although Epicurus has been commonly misunderstood as an advocate of the rampant pursuit of pleasure, he, in fact, maintained that a person can only be happy and free from suffering by living wisely, soberly, and morally. He strongly disapproved of raw, excessive sensuality and warned that a person must take into account whether the consequences of his actions will result in suffering, writing, "the pleasant life is produced not by a string of drinking bouts and revelries, nor by the enjoyment of boys and women, nor by fish and the other items on an expensive menu, but by sober reasoning." He also wrote that a single good piece of cheese could be equally pleasing as an entire feast. Furthermore, Epicurus taught that "it is not possible to live pleasurably without living sensibly and nobly and justly", because a person who engages in acts of dishonesty or injustice will be "loaded with troubles" on account of his own guilty conscience and will live in constant fear that his wrongdoings will be discovered by others. A person who is kind and just to others, however, will have no fear and will be more likely to attain ataraxia.

Epicurus distinguished between two different types of pleasure: "moving" pleasures (κατὰ κίνησιν ἡδοναί) and "static" pleasures (καταστηματικαὶ ἡδοναί). "Moving" pleasures occur when one is in the process of satisfying a desire and involve an active titillation of the senses. After one's desires have been satisfied (e.g. when one is full after eating), the pleasure quickly goes away and the suffering of wanting to fulfill the desire again returns. For Epicurus, static pleasures are the best pleasures because moving pleasures are always bound up with pain. Epicurus had a low opinion of sex and marriage, regarding both as having dubious value. Instead, he maintained that platonic friendships are essential to living a happy life. One of the Principal Doctrines states, "Of the things wisdom acquires for the blessedness of life as a whole, far the greatest is the possession of friendship." He also taught that philosophy is itself a pleasure to engage in. One of the quotes from Epicurus recorded in the Vatican Sayings declares, "In other pursuits, the hard-won fruit comes at the end. But in philosophy, delight keeps pace with knowledge. It is not after the lesson that enjoyment comes: learning and enjoyment happen at the same time."

Epicurus distinguishes between three types of desires: natural and necessary, natural but unnecessary, and vain and empty. Natural and necessary desires include the desires for food and shelter. These are easy to satisfy, difficult to eliminate, bring pleasure when satisfied, and are naturally limited. Going beyond these limits produces unnecessary desires, such as the desire for luxury foods. Although food is necessary, luxury food is not necessary. Correspondingly, Epicurus advocates a life of hedonistic moderation by reducing desire, thus eliminating the unhappiness caused by unfulfilled desires. Vain desires include desires for power, wealth, and fame. These are difficult to satisfy because no matter how much one gets, one can always want more. These desires are inculcated by society and by false beliefs about what we need. They are not natural and are to be shunned.

Epicurus' teachings were introduced into medical philosophy and practice by the Epicurean doctor Asclepiades of Bithynia, who was the first physician who introduced Greek medicine in Rome. Asclepiades introduced the friendly, sympathetic, pleasing and painless treatment of patients. He advocated humane treatment of mental disorders, had insane persons freed from confinement and treated them with natural therapy, such as diet and massages. His teachings are surprisingly modern; therefore Asclepiades is considered to be a pioneer physician in psychotherapy, physical therapy and molecular medicine.

Physics
Epicurus writes in his Letter to Herodotus (not the historian) that "nothing ever arises from the nonexistent", indicating that all events therefore have causes, regardless of whether those causes are known or unknown. Similarly, he also writes that nothing ever passes away into nothingness, because, "if an object that passes from our view were completely annihilated, everything in the world would have perished, since that into which things were dissipated would be nonexistent." He therefore states: "The totality of things was always just as it is at present and will always remain the same because there is nothing into which it can change, inasmuch as there is nothing outside the totality that could intrude and effect change." Like Democritus before him, Epicurus taught that all matter is entirely made of extremely tiny particles called "atoms" (meaning "indivisible"). For Epicurus and his followers, the existence of atoms was a matter of empirical observation; Epicurus's devoted follower, the Roman poet Lucretius, cites the gradual wearing down of rings from being worn, statues from being kissed, stones from being dripped on by water, and roads from being walked on in On the Nature of Things as evidence for the existence of atoms as tiny, imperceptible particles.

Also like Democritus, Epicurus was a materialist who taught that the only things that exist are atoms and void. Void occurs in any place where there are no atoms. Epicurus and his followers believed that atoms and void are both infinite and that the universe is therefore boundless. In On the Nature of Things, Lucretius argues this point using the example of a man throwing a javelin at the theoretical boundary of a finite universe. He states that the javelin must either go past the edge of the universe, in which case it is not really a boundary, or it must be blocked by something and prevented from continuing its path, but, if that happens, then the object blocking it must be outside the confines of the universe. As a result of this belief that the universe and the number of atoms in it are infinite, Epicurus and the Epicureans believed that there must also be infinitely many worlds within the universe.

Epicurus taught that the motion of atoms is constant, eternal, and without beginning or end. He held that there are two kinds of motion: the motion of atoms and the motion of visible objects. Both kinds of motion are real and not illusory. Democritus had described atoms as not only eternally moving, but also eternally flying through space, colliding, coalescing, and separating from each other as necessary. In a rare departure from Democritus's physics, Epicurus posited the idea of atomic "swerve", one of his best-known original ideas. According to this idea, atoms, as they are travelling through space, may deviate slightly from the course they would ordinarily be expected to follow. Epicurus's reason for introducing this doctrine was because he wanted to preserve the concepts of free will and ethical responsibility while still maintaining the deterministic physical model of atomism. Lucretius describes it, saying, "It is this slight deviation of primal bodies, at indeterminate times and places, which keeps the mind as such from experiencing an inner compulsion in doing everything it does and from being forced to endure and suffer like a captive in chains."

Epicurus was first to assert human freedom as a result of the fundamental indeterminism in the motion of atoms. This has led some philosophers to think that, for Epicurus, free will was caused directly by chance. In his On the Nature of Things, Lucretius appears to suggest this in the best-known passage on Epicurus' position. In his Letter to Menoeceus, however, Epicurus follows Aristotle and clearly identifies three possible causes: "some things happen of necessity, others by chance, others through our own agency." Aristotle said some things "depend on us" (eph'hemin). Epicurus agreed, and said it is to these last things that praise and blame naturally attach. For Epicurus, the "swerve" of the atoms simply defeated determinism to leave room for autonomous agency.

Theology

In his Letter to Menoeceus, a summary of his own moral and theological teachings, the first piece of advice Epicurus himself gives to his student is: "First, believe that a god is an indestructible and blessed animal, in accordance with the general conception of god commonly held, and do not ascribe to god anything foreign to his indestructibility or repugnant to his blessedness." Epicurus maintained that he and his followers knew that the gods exist because "our knowledge of them is a matter of clear and distinct perception", meaning that people can empirically sense their presences. He did not mean that people can see the gods as physical objects, but rather that they can see visions of the gods sent from the remote regions of interstellar space in which they actually reside. According to George K. Strodach, Epicurus could have easily dispensed of the gods entirely without greatly altering his materialist worldview, but the gods still play one important function in Epicurus's theology as the paragons of moral virtue to be emulated and admired.

Epicurus rejected the conventional Greek view of the gods as anthropomorphic beings who walked the earth like ordinary people, fathered illegitimate offspring with mortals, and pursued personal feuds. Instead, he taught that the gods are morally perfect, but detached and immobile beings who live in the remote regions of interstellar space. In line with these teachings, Epicurus adamantly rejected the idea that deities were involved in human affairs in any way. Epicurus maintained that the gods are so utterly perfect and removed from the world that they are incapable of listening to prayers or supplications or doing virtually anything aside from contemplating their own perfections. In his Letter to Herodotus, he specifically denies that the gods have any control over natural phenomena, arguing that this would contradict their fundamental nature, which is perfect, because any kind of worldly involvement would tarnish their perfection. He further warned that believing that the gods control natural phenomena would only mislead people into believing the superstitious view that the gods punish humans for wrongdoing, which only instills fear and prevents people from attaining ataraxia.

Epicurus himself criticizes popular religion in both his Letter to Menoeceus and his Letter to Herodotus, but in a restrained and moderate tone. Later Epicureans mainly followed the same ideas as Epicurus, believing in the existence of the gods, but emphatically rejecting the idea of divine providence. Their criticisms of popular religion, however, are often less gentle than those of Epicurus himself. The Letter to Pythocles, written by a later Epicurean, is dismissive and contemptuous towards popular religion and Epicurus's devoted follower, the Roman poet Lucretius ( 99 BC –  55 BC), passionately assailed popular religion in his philosophical poem On the Nature of Things. In this poem, Lucretius declares that popular religious practices not only do not instill virtue, but rather result in "misdeeds both wicked and ungodly", citing the mythical sacrifice of Iphigenia as an example. Lucretius argues that divine creation and providence are illogical, not because the gods do not exist, but rather because these notions are incompatible with the Epicurean principles of the gods' indestructibility and blessedness. The later Pyrrhonist philosopher Sextus Empiricus ( 160 –  210 AD) rejected the teachings of the Epicureans specifically because he regarded them as theological "Dogmaticists".

Epicurean paradox

The Epicurean paradox or riddle of Epicurus or Epicurus' trilemma is a version of the problem of evil. Lactantius attributes this trilemma to Epicurus in De Ira Dei, 13, 20-21:

God, he says, either wishes to take away evils, and is unable; or He is able, and is unwilling; or He is neither willing nor able, or He is both willing and able. If He is willing and is unable, He is feeble, which is not in accordance with the character of God; if He is able and unwilling, He is envious, which is equally at variance with God; if He is neither willing nor able, He is both envious and feeble, and therefore not God; if He is both willing and able, which alone is suitable to God, from what source then are evils? Or why does He not remove them?

In Dialogues concerning Natural Religion (1779), David Hume also attributes the argument to Epicurus:

Epicurus’s old questions are yet unanswered. Is he willing to prevent evil, but not able? then is he impotent. Is he able, but not willing? then is he malevolent. Is he both able and willing? whence then is evil?

No extant writings of Epicurus contain this argument. However, the vast majority of Epicurus's writings have been lost and it is possible that some form of this argument may have been found in his lost treatise On the Gods, which Diogenes Laërtius describes as one of his greatest works. If Epicurus really did make some form of this argument, it would not have been an argument against the existence of deities, but rather an argument against divine providence. Epicurus's extant writings demonstrate that he did believe in the existence of deities. Furthermore, religion was such an integral part of daily life in Greece during the early Hellenistic Period that it is doubtful anyone during that period could have been an atheist in the modern sense of the word. Instead, the Greek word  (átheos), meaning "without a god", was used as a term of abuse, not as an attempt to describe a person's beliefs.

Politics
Epicurus promoted an innovative theory of justice as a social contract. Justice, Epicurus said, is an agreement neither to harm nor be harmed, and we need to have such a contract in order to enjoy fully the benefits of living together in a well-ordered society. Laws and punishments are needed to keep misguided fools in line who would otherwise break the contract. But the wise person sees the usefulness of justice, and because of his limited desires, he has no need to engage in the conduct prohibited by the laws in any case. Laws that are useful for promoting happiness are just, but those that are not useful are not just. (Principal Doctrines 31–40)

Epicurus discouraged participation in politics, as doing so leads to perturbation and status seeking. He instead advocated not drawing attention to oneself. This principle is epitomised by the phrase lathe biōsas, meaning "live in obscurity", "get through life without drawing attention to yourself", i.e., live without pursuing glory or wealth or power, but anonymously, enjoying little things like food, the company of friends, etc. Plutarch elaborated on this theme in his essay Is the Saying "Live in Obscurity" Right? (An recte dictum sit latenter esse vivendum) 1128c; cf. Flavius Philostratus, Vita Apollonii 8.28.12.

Works

Epicurus was an extremely prolific writer. According to Diogenes Laërtius, he wrote around 300 treatises on a variety of subjects. Although more original writings of Epicurus have survived to the present day than of any other Hellenistic Greek philosopher, the vast majority of everything he wrote has still been lost, and most of what is known about Epicurus's teachings come from the writings of his later followers, particularly the Roman poet Lucretius. The only surviving complete works by Epicurus are three relatively lengthy letters, which are quoted in their entirety in Book X of Diogenes Laërtius's Lives and Opinions of Eminent Philosophers, and two groups of quotes: the Principal Doctrines (Κύριαι Δόξαι), which are likewise preserved through quotation by Diogenes Laërtius, and the Vatican Sayings, preserved in a manuscript from the Vatican Library that was first discovered in 1888. In the Letter to Herodotus and the Letter to Pythocles, Epicurus summarizes his philosophy on nature and, in the Letter to Menoeceus, he summarizes his moral teachings. Numerous fragments of Epicurus's lost thirty-seven volume treatise On Nature have been found among the charred papyrus fragments at the Villa of the Papyri at Herculaneum. Scholars first began attempting to unravel and decipher these scrolls in 1800, but the efforts are painstaking and are still ongoing.
According to Diogenes Laertius (10.27-9), the major works of Epicurus include:

 On Nature, in 37 books
 On Atoms and the Void
 On Love
 Abridgment of the Arguments employed against the Natural Philosophers
 Against the Megarians
 Problems
 Fundamental Propositions (Kyriai Doxai)
 On Choice and Avoidance
 On the Chief Good
 On the Criterion (the Canon)
 Chaeridemus, 
 On the Gods
 On Piety
 Hegesianax
 Four essays on Lives
 Essay on Just Dealing
 Neocles
 Essay addressed to Themista
 The Banquet (Symposium)
 Eurylochus
 Essay addressed to Metrodorus
 Essay on Seeing
 Essay on the Angle in an Atom
 Essay on Touch
 Essay on Fate
 Opinions on the Passions
 Treatise addressed to Timocrates
 Prognostics
 Exhortations
 On Images
 On Perceptions
 Aristobulus
 Essay on Music (i.e., on music, poetry, and dance)
 On Justice and the other Virtues
 On Gifts and Gratitude
 Polymedes
 Timocrates (three books)
 Metrodorus (five books)
 Antidorus (two books)
 Opinions about Diseases and Death, addressed to Mithras
 Callistolas
 Essay on Kingly Power
 Anaximenes
 Letters

Legacy

Ancient Epicureanism

Epicureanism was extremely popular from the very beginning. Diogenes Laërtius records that the number of Epicureans throughout the world exceeded the populations of entire cities. Nonetheless, Epicurus was not universally admired and, within his own lifetime, he was vilified as an ignorant buffoon and egoistic sybarite. He remained the most simultaneously admired and despised philosopher in the Mediterranean for the next nearly five centuries. Epicureanism rapidly spread beyond the Greek mainland all across the Mediterranean world. By the first century BC, it had established a strong foothold in Italy. The Roman orator Cicero (106 – 43 BC), who deplored Epicurean ethics, lamented, "the Epicureans have taken Italy by storm."

The overwhelming majority of surviving Greek and Roman sources are vehemently negative towards Epicureanism and, according to Pamela Gordon, they routinely depict Epicurus himself as "monstrous or laughable". Many Romans in particular took a negative view of Epicureanism, seeing its advocacy of the pursuit of voluptas ("pleasure") as contrary to the Roman ideal of virtus ("manly virtue"). The Romans therefore often stereotyped Epicurus and his followers as weak and effeminate. Prominent critics of his philosophy include prominent authors such as the Roman Stoic Seneca the Younger ( 4 BC – AD 65) and the Greek Middle Platonist Plutarch ( 46 –  120), who both derided these stereotypes as immoral and disreputable. Gordon characterizes anti-Epicurean rhetoric as so "heavy-handed" and misrepresentative of Epicurus's actual teachings that they sometimes come across as "comical". In his De vita beata, Seneca states that the "sect of Epicurus... has a bad reputation, and yet it does not deserve it." and compares it to "a man in a dress: your chastity remains, your virility is unimpaired, your body has not submitted sexually, but in your hand is a tympanum."

Epicureanism was a notoriously conservative philosophical school; although Epicurus's later followers did expand on his philosophy, they dogmatically retained what he himself had originally taught without modifying it. Epicureans and admirers of Epicureanism revered Epicurus himself as a great teacher of ethics, a savior, and even a god. His image was worn on finger rings, portraits of him were displayed in living rooms, and wealthy followers venerated likenesses of him in marble sculpture. His admirers revered his sayings as divine oracles, carried around copies of his writings, and cherished copies of his letters like the letters of an apostle. On the twentieth day of every month, admirers of his teachings would perform a solemn ritual to honor his memory. At the same time, opponents of his teachings denounced him with vehemence and persistence.

However, in the first and second centuries AD, Epicureanism gradually began to decline as it failed to compete with Stoicism, which had an ethical system more in line with traditional Roman values. Epicureanism also suffered decay in the wake of Christianity, which was also rapidly expanding throughout the Roman Empire. Of all the Greek philosophical schools, Epicureanism was the one most at odds with the new Christian teachings, since Epicureans believed that the soul was mortal, denied the existence of an afterlife, denied that the divine had any active role in human life, and advocated pleasure as the foremost goal of human existence. As such, Christian writers such as Justin Martyr ( 100– 165 AD), Athenagoras of Athens ( 133– 190), Tertullian ( 155– 240), and Clement of Alexandria ( 150– 215), Arnobius (died  330), and Lactantius (c. 250-c.325) all singled it out for the most vitriolic criticism.

In spite of this, DeWitt argues that Epicureanism and Christianity share much common language, calling Epicureanism "the first missionary philosophy" and "the first world philosophy". Both Epicureanism and Christianity placed strong emphasis on the importance of love and forgiveness and early Christian portrayals of Jesus are often similar to Epicurean portrayals of Epicurus. DeWitt argues that Epicureanism, in many ways, helped pave the way for the spread of Christianity by "helping to bridge the gap between Greek intellectualism and a religious way of life" and "shunt[ing] the emphasis from the political to the social virtues and offer[ing] what may be called a religion of humanity."

Middle Ages

By the early fifth century AD, Epicureanism was virtually extinct. The Christian Church Father Augustine of Hippo (354–430 AD) declared, "its ashes are so cold that not a single spark can be struck from them." While the ideas of Plato and Aristotle could easily be adapted to suit a Christian worldview, the ideas of Epicurus were not nearly as easily amenable. As such, while Plato and Aristotle enjoyed a privileged place in Christian philosophy throughout the Middle Ages, Epicurus was not held in such esteem. Information about Epicurus's teachings was available, through Lucretius's On the Nature of Things, quotations of it found in medieval Latin grammars and florilegia, and encyclopedias, such as Isidore of Seville's Etymologiae (seventh century) and Hrabanus Maurus's De universo (ninth century), but there is little evidence that these teachings were systematically studied or comprehended.

During the Middle Ages, Epicurus was remembered by the educated as a philosopher, but he frequently appeared in popular culture as a gatekeeper to the Garden of Delights, the "proprietor of the kitchen, the tavern, and the brothel." He appears in this guise in Martianus Capella's Marriage of Mercury and Philology (fifth century), John of Salisbury's Policraticus (1159), John Gower's Mirour de l'Omme, and Geoffrey Chaucer's Canterbury Tales. Epicurus and his followers appear in Dante Alighieri's Inferno in the Sixth Circle of Hell, where they are imprisoned in flaming coffins for having believed that the soul dies with the body.

Renaissance

In 1417, a manuscript-hunter named Poggio Bracciolini discovered a copy of Lucretius's On the Nature of Things in a monastery near Lake Constance. The discovery of this manuscript was met with immense excitement, because scholars were eager to analyze and study the teachings of classical philosophers and this previously-forgotten text contained the most comprehensive account of Epicurus's teachings known in Latin. The first scholarly dissertation on Epicurus, De voluptate (On Pleasure) by the Italian Humanist and Catholic priest Lorenzo Valla was published in 1431. Valla made no mention of Lucretius or his poem. Instead, he presented the treatise as a discussion on the nature of the highest good between an Epicurean, a Stoic, and a Christian. Valla's dialogue ultimately rejects Epicureanism, but, by presenting an Epicurean as a member of the dispute, Valla lent Epicureanism credibility as a philosophy that deserved to be taken seriously.

None of the Quattrocento Humanists ever clearly endorsed Epicureanism, but scholars such as Francesco Zabarella (1360–1417), Francesco Filelfo (1398–1481), Cristoforo Landino (1424–1498), and Leonardo Bruni ( 1370–1444) did give Epicureanism a fairer analysis than it had traditionally received and provided a less overtly hostile assessment of Epicurus himself. Nonetheless, "Epicureanism" remained a pejorative, synonymous with extreme egoistic pleasure-seeking, rather than a name of a philosophical school. This reputation discouraged orthodox Christian scholars from taking what others might regard as an inappropriately keen interest in Epicurean teachings. Epicureanism did not take hold in Italy, France, or England until the seventeenth century. Even the liberal religious skeptics who might have been expected to take an interest in Epicureanism evidently did not; Étienne Dolet (1509–1546) only mentions Epicurus once in all his writings and François Rabelais (between 1483 and 1494–1553) never mentions him at all. Michel de Montaigne (1533–1592) is the exception to this trend, quoting a full 450 lines of Lucretius's On the Nature of Things in his Essays. His interest in Lucretius, however, seems to have been primarily literary and he is ambiguous about his feelings on Lucretius's Epicurean worldview. During the Protestant Reformation, the label "Epicurean" was bandied back and forth as an insult between Protestants and Catholics.

Revival

In the seventeenth century, the French Catholic priest and scholar Pierre Gassendi (1592–1655) sought to dislodge Aristotelianism from its position of the highest dogma by presenting Epicureanism as a better and more rational alternative. In 1647, Gassendi published his book De vita et moribus Epicuri (The Life and Morals of Epicurus), a passionate defense of Epicureanism. In 1649, he published a commentary on Diogenes Laërtius's Life of Epicurus. He left Syntagma philosophicum (Philosophical Compendium), a synthesis of Epicurean doctrines, unfinished at the time of his death in 1655. It was finally published in 1658, after undergoing revision by his editors. Gassendi modified Epicurus's teachings to make them palatable for a Christian audience. For instance, he argued that atoms were not eternal, uncreated, and infinite in number, instead contending that an extremely large but finite number of atoms were created by God at creation.

As a result of Gassendi's modifications, his books were never censored by the Catholic Church. They came to exert profound influence on later writings about Epicurus. Gassendi's version of Epicurus's teachings became popular among some members of English scientific circles. For these scholars, however, Epicurean atomism was merely a starting point for their own idiosyncratic adaptations of it. To orthodox thinkers, Epicureanism was still regarded as immoral and heretical. For instance, Lucy Hutchinson (1620–1681), the first translator of Lucretius's On the Nature of Things into English, railed against Epicurus as "a lunatic dog" who formulated "ridiculous, impious, execrable doctrines".

Epicurus's teachings were made respectable in England by the natural philosopher Walter Charleton (1619–1707), whose first Epicurean work, The Darkness of Atheism Dispelled by the Light of Nature (1652), advanced Epicureanism as a "new" atomism. His next work Physiologia Epicuro-Gassendo-Charletoniana, or a Fabrick of Science Natural, upon a Hypothesis of Atoms, Founded by Epicurus, Repaired by Petrus Gassendus, and Augmented by Walter Charleton (1654) emphasized this idea. These works, together with Charleton's Epicurus's Morals (1658), provided the English public with readily available descriptions of Epicurus's philosophy and assured orthodox Christians that Epicureanism was no threat to their beliefs. The Royal Society, chartered in 1662, advanced Epicurean atomism. One of the most prolific defenders of atomism was the chemist Robert Boyle (1627–1691), who argued for it in publications such as The Origins of Forms and Qualities (1666), Experiments, Notes, etc. about the Mechanical Origin and Production of Divers Particular Qualities (1675), and Of the Excellency and Grounds of the Mechanical Hypothesis (1674). By the end of the seventeenth century, Epicurean atomism was widely accepted by members of the English scientific community as the best model for explaining the physical world, but it had been modified so greatly that Epicurus was no longer seen as its original parent.

Enlightenment and after
The Anglican bishop Joseph Butler's anti-Epicurean polemics in his Fifteen Sermons Preached at the Rolls Chapel (1726) and Analogy of Religion (1736) set the tune for what most orthodox Christians believed about Epicureanism for the remainder of the eighteenth and nineteenth centuries. Nonetheless, there are a few indications from this time period of Epicurus's improving reputation. Epicureanism was beginning to lose its associations with indiscriminate and insatiable gluttony, which had been characteristic of its reputation ever since antiquity. Instead, the word "epicure" began to refer to a person with extremely refined taste in food. Examples of this usage include "Epicurean cooks / sharpen with cloyless sauce his appetite" from William Shakespeare's Antony and Cleopatra (Act II. scene i;  1607) and "such an epicure was Potiphar—to please his tooth and pamper his flesh with delicacies" from William Whately's Prototypes (1646).

Around the same time, the Epicurean injunction to "live in obscurity" was beginning to gain popularity as well. In 1685, Sir William Temple (1628–1699) abandoned a promising career as a diplomat and instead retired to his garden, devoting himself to writing essays on Epicurus's moral teachings. That same year, John Dryden translated the celebrated lines from Book II of Lucretius's On the Nature of Things: "'Tis pleasant, safely to behold from shore / The rowling ship, and hear the Tempest roar." Meanwhile, John Locke (1632–1704) adapted Gassendi's modified version of Epicurus's epistemology, which became highly influential on English empiricism. Many thinkers with sympathies towards the Enlightenment endorsed Epicureanism as an admirable moral philosophy. Thomas Jefferson (1743–1826), one of the Founding Fathers of the United States, declared in 1819, "I too am an Epicurean. I consider the genuine (not imputed) doctrines of Epicurus as containing everything rational in moral philosophy which Greece and Rome have left us."

The German philosopher Karl Marx (1818–1883), whose ideas are the basis of Marxism, was profoundly influenced as a young man by the teachings of Epicurus and his doctoral thesis was a Hegelian dialectical analysis of the differences between the natural philosophies of Democritus and Epicurus. Marx viewed Democritus as a rationalist skeptic, whose epistemology was inherently contradictory, but saw Epicurus as a dogmatic empiricist, whose worldview is internally consistent and practically applicable. The British poet Alfred Tennyson (1809–1892) praised "the sober majesties / of settled, sweet, Epicurean life" in his 1868 poem "Lucretius". Epicurus's ethical teachings also had an indirect impact on the philosophy of Utilitarianism in England during the nineteenth century. Soviet politician Joseph Stalin (1878–1953) lauded Epicurus by stating: "He was the greatest philosopher of all time. He was the one who recommended practicing virtue to derive the greatest joy from life".

Friedrich Nietzsche once noted: "Even today many educated people think that the victory of Christianity over Greek philosophy is a proof of the superior truth of the former – although in this case it was only the coarser and more violent that conquered the more spiritual and delicate. So far as superior truth is concerned, it is enough to observe that the awakening sciences have allied themselves point by point with the philosophy of Epicurus, but point by point rejected Christianity."

Academic interest in Epicurus and other Hellenistic philosophers increased over the course of the late twentieth and early twenty-first centuries, with an unprecedented number of monographs, articles, abstracts, and conference papers being published on the subject. The texts from the library of Philodemus of Gadara in the Villa of the Papyri in Herculaneum, first discovered between 1750 and 1765, are being deciphered, translated, and published by scholars part of the Philodemus Translation Project, funded by the United States National Endowment for the Humanities, and part of the Centro per lo Studio dei Papiri Ercolanesi in Naples. Epicurus's popular appeal among non-scholars is difficult to gauge, but it seems to be relatively comparable to the appeal of more traditionally popular ancient Greek philosophical subjects such as Stoicism, Aristotle, and Plato.

See also
 Eikas
 Epikoros
 Philosophy of happiness
 Separation of church and state

Notes

References

Bibliography

Further reading
 Texts
 
 
 
 
 
 
 Oates, Whitney J. (1940). The Stoic and Epicurean philosophers, The Complete Extant Writings of Epicurus, Epictetus, Lucretius and Marcus Aurelius. New York: Modern Library.
 

 Studies
 Bailey C. (1928). The Greek Atomists and Epicurus, Oxford: Clarendon Press.
 
 
 
 
 
 
 
 
 
 
 
 William Wallace. Epicureanism. SPCK (1880)

External links

 
 
 
 
 Stoic And Epicurean by Robert Drew Hicks (1910) (Internet Archive) 
 Epicurea, Hermann Usener - full text
 
 .
 Society of Friends of Epicurus
 Discussion Forum for Epicurus and Epicurean philosophy - EpicureanFriends.com

4th-century BC Greek people
4th-century BC philosophers
4th-century BC writers
3rd-century BC Greek people
3rd-century BC philosophers
3rd-century BC writers
341 BC births
270 BC deaths
Ancient Greek epistemologists
Ancient Greek ethicists
Ancient Greek metaphysicians
Ancient Greek philosophers of mind
Ancient Greek physicists
Ancient Samians
Empiricists
Epicurean philosophers
Greek male writers
Materialists
4th-century BC religious leaders
3rd-century BC religious leaders
Philosophers of death